Shishu Vihar is a school in Aurangabad, Maharashtra state in India.

The school foundation was laid by freedom fighter and activist Mrs Vijayatai Kabra. The school teaches students from Prep to 10th Standard.   As of 2011, the Principal is Mrs. Usha Naik. Subjects are taught in both Marathi and in English. The subject of Sanskrit is also taught here.

Activities at the school include Scouting, Guides and Road Safety Police (R.S.P.). The school building has three floors with a computer lab and a library, on large grounds.

Schools in Maharashtra
Education in Aurangabad, Maharashtra